Lyckan kommer is a 1942 Swedish comedy film directed by Hasse Ekman. Ekmans script was filmed in Denmark the same year with the title Lykken kommer, directed by Emanuel Gregers and with Marguerite Viby repeating her role and Ebbe Rode playing Järrels role.

Plot summary
This fairy tale for grown-up children tells us about Georg and Monika Hedberg, they are so rich and live in such luxury that they have lost sight of each other and the ability to be happy, the way they were when they lived in humble circumstances. Now they quarrel and annoy each other instead, and finally they agree to get a divorce.

In consultation with their lawyer they make a bet to save their marriage. The lawyer says that they are simply too spoiled, impractical and behave like two children. They will now start over again, move to a humble apartment, go back to work and live solely on their income during these months while the lawyer freezes all their assets. Can a more modest life make happiness come back?

Cast
Stig Järrel as Georg Hedberg
Marguerite Viby as Monika Hedberg 
Carl Reinholdz as Algot Larsson
Dagmar Olsson as Bojan Larsson
Georg Funkquist as Tranér
Torsten Winge as Svane 
Lasse Krantz as Bergman
Bengt Janzon as Dimgren 
Einar Axelsson as Berger 
Hugo Björne as Lennart Broberg 
Birgit Sergelius as Lillan Broberg
Bertil Ehrenmark as Sergej Borsakoff
Jura Tamkin as Alexandrovitj 
Berndt Westerberg as Mr. Birke
Karl Erik Flens as Nils Boström

External links

1942 films
Films directed by Hasse Ekman
1940s Swedish-language films
Swedish comedy films
1942 comedy films
Swedish black-and-white films
1940s Swedish films